Cor Wezepoel (30 April 1896 – 22 January 1954) was a Dutch sprinter. He competed in the men's 100 metres at the 1920 Summer Olympics.

References

1896 births
1954 deaths
Athletes (track and field) at the 1920 Summer Olympics
Dutch male sprinters
Olympic athletes of the Netherlands
Place of birth missing